"Carrera" is a 2009 single by Karl Wolf released in Canada as a follow-up single to the successful Africa. The song is a remix of the original Carrera taken from his 2007 album Bite the Bullet. It entered the Canadian Hot 100 on the chart dated 13 June 2009 and peaked at #39 on the chart dated 15 August 2009.

Music video
The official video, a Radar Films production was shot in Montreal, with Karl Wolf as producer and director and Michèle Grodin co-producer and presented by Lone Wolf Entertainment, a production company owned by Karl Wolf. The video features Canadian supermodel (and former beauty pageant contestant) Vanessa Blouin.

Chart

References

2009 singles
Karl Wolf songs
2007 songs